Psilogramma dantchenkoi is a moth of the family Sphingidae. It is known from Java in Indonesia.

References

Psilogramma
Moths described in 2001
Endemic fauna of Indonesia